Lamba da Şişesiz Yanmaz mı is a Turkish folkloric tune (Kaşık Havası) .The meter is 4/4.

See also
Kaşık Havası
Konyali

References

Turkish music
Turkish songs
Songwriter unknown
Year of song unknown